Donald Coburn may refer to:

 Donald S. Coburn (born 1939), American politician and jurist from New Jersey
 Donald L. Coburn (born 1938), American dramatist